Outremer Champions Cup was a football cup tournament held annually between 1997 and 2007 and contested by four teams from overseas departments and territories of France, including winners of the Coupe T.O.M., Coupe D.O.M. and Océan Indien Cup. Before 2004, it was called simply Coupe D.O.M.-T.O.M. (Outremer means "overseas".)

The tournament was always played in France. In 2008, it was decided to replace this competition by a similar one played by national teams called Coupe de l'Outre-Mer.

Previous winners

References 

French football friendly trophies
Football cup competitions in Overseas France